The Limerick Junior Hurling Championship is an annual Gaelic Athletic Association competition organised by Limerick GAA among the top hurling clubs in County Limerick. The winner qualifies to represent the county in the  Munster Junior Club Hurling Championship, the winner of which progresses to the All-Ireland Junior Club Hurling Championship. Apart from a few years when there was an Intermediate hurling Championship the Junior Hurling championship was the second most important hurling competition in Limerick. When the Intermediate hurling Championship restarted in 1988, the Junior became the third most important competition and in 2014 with the advent of the Premier Intermediate hurling Championship it became the Fourth tier of Limerick hurling.

Roll of honour

See also

 Limerick Senior Football Championship
 Limerick Intermediate Hurling Championship

External links
Official Limerick website
Limerick on Hoganstand
Limerick Club GAA

See also

 Limerick Senior Hurling Championship
 Limerick Intermediate Hurling Championship
 Limerick Premier Intermediate Hurling Championship

External links
Official Limerick website
Limerick on Hoganstand
Limerick Club GAA

1
Junior hurling county championships